Mr. Six (previously known as Fading Wave) is a 2015 Chinese crime drama film directed by Guan Hu and written by Dong Runnian. It stars Feng Xiaogang, Zhang Hanyu, Xu Qing, Li Yifeng and Kris Wu. The film closed the 72nd Venice International Film Festival in an out-of-competition screening. Mr. Six was selected to be screened in the Special Presentations section of the 2015 Toronto International Film Festival. Mr. Six was released on 24 December 2015 in China.

On 22 November 2015, Feng Xiaogang, won the Best Actor Award at the 52nd Golden Horse Awards for his performance in Mr. Six.

Plot
Mr. Six tells of a 50-or-so-year-old street punk called "Mr. Six" who has reigned over the Beijing streets as the neighbourhood kingpin for many years. One day, he learns his son Xiaobo ("Little Bo") is in dispute with a well-connected young street-racing gang leader, Xiaofei. Mr. Six steps up to help defend him. He attempts to settle the debts of his son by relying on his old school rules and by the help of his old friends. Though things do not go as expected, Mr. Six and his son are in deep trouble. Meanwhile, he is diagnosed with coronary artery disease. In his attempt to stand by his principle, he wages war against the opposing group. Mr. Six's old gang members who are in different places come to join with him where Mr. Six were unfortunately die in the midst of the fight due to his terminal diseases.  In the end, the son is shown well and running an open-bar as he promised. His gang members are bailed out from jail by their own group influence. The opposing gang members' leader were arrested after the news about his corrupted family is exposed.

Cast
 Feng Xiaogang as Mr. Six
 Zhang Hanyu as Mensan'er (Scrapper)
 Xu Qing as Hua Xiazi (Ms. Chatterbox)
 Li Yifeng as Xiaobo/Bobby (Mr. Six's son)
 Kris Wu as Xiaofei (Kris)
 Liu Hua as Dengzhao'er (Lampshade)
 Liang Jing as Dengzhao'er's wife
 Wu Jinyan as Zheng Hong
 Congo Pax
 Yu Hewei
 Lian Yiming
 Shang Yuxian
 Zhang Yi
 Zhang Yishan
 Ning Hao
 TFBoys

Production
Principal photography commenced in late November 2014 in Beijing and ended in February 2015. On 12 December 2014, Feng Xiaogang, Liu Hua, Zhang Hanyu, Wang Zhonglei, Guan Hu, Li Yifeng, Xu Qing, Liang Jing, and Kris Wu attended the opening ceremony.

Reception

Box office
The film grossed  on its opening weekend in China and went on to take the top spot during the Holiday period. It grossed $139 million overall.

Accolades

References

External links
 
 
 
 

2010s Mandarin-language films
2015 crime drama films
Chinese crime drama films
Films directed by Guan Hu
Films set in Beijing
Films shot in Beijing
Huayi Brothers films